Bulyak (Büläk) is a rural locality (a selo) in Igmetovsky Selsoviet, Ilishevsky District, Bashkortostan, Russia. The population was 20 as of 2010.

Geography 
Bulyak is located 19 km north of Verkhneyarkeyevo (the district's administrative centre) by road. Tashkichi is the nearest rural locality.

References 

Rural localities in Ilishevsky District